Basic is an unincorporated community in Clarke County, Mississippi, United States.

History
Basic is located on the former Mobile and Ohio Railroad and was once home to two sawmills and two general stores.

A post office called Basic was established in 1900, and remained in operation until 1945. A variant name was "Basic City". The origin of the name "Basic" is obscure.

In South and West: From a Notebook, Joan Didion notes that when she visited the town in the 1970s, it was "not on the map."

A member of the Tallahatta Formation known as Basic City Shale is named for Basic.

References

Unincorporated communities in Clarke County, Mississippi
Unincorporated communities in Mississippi